Taiwan (governed by the Republic of China) competed at the 1968 Summer Olympics in Mexico City, Mexico. 43 competitors, 35 men and 8 women, took part in 57 events in 8 sports.

Medalists

Bronze
Chi Cheng — athletics, women's 80 metre hurdles

Athletics
https://en.m.wikipedia.org/wiki/Athletics_at_the_1968_Summer_Olympics_%E2%80%93_Women%27s_80_metres_hurdles

Boxing

Cycling

Five cyclists represented Taiwan in 1968.

Individual road race
 Deng Chueng-hwai
 Liu Cheng-tao
 Shue Ming-shu

Team time trial
 Deng Chueng-hwai
 Liu Cheng-tao
 Shue Ming-shu
 Jiang Guang-nan

Sprint
 Fan Yue-tao

1000m time trial
 Fan Yue-tao

Gymnastics

Sailing

Shooting

Eight shooters, all male, represented Taiwan in 1968.

25 m pistol
 Chou Yen-sheng

50 m pistol
 Chen Jeng-gang
 Cheng Chi-sen

300 m rifle, three positions
 Wu Tao-yan

50 m rifle, three positions
 Wu Tao-yan
 Pan Kou-ang

50 m rifle, prone
 Wu Tao-yan
 Tai Chao-chih

Trap
 Lin Ho-ming
 Cheng Sung-gun

Swimming

Weightlifting

See also

Chinese Taipei at the Olympics

Notes

References

External links
Official Olympic Reports
International Olympic Committee results database

Nations at the 1968 Summer Olympics
1968
1968 in Taiwanese sport